A list of avant-garde and experimental films released in the 1940s.

Notes

1940s
Avant-garde